Snail on the Slope (Russian - "Улитка на склоне") is a science fiction novel by Soviet authors Boris and Arkady Strugatsky. The first version of the novel was written in 1965 (during March 6 and 20), but then it was significantly rewritten. The original draft was published in 1990 under the title Disquiet.

In the spring of 1966 the so-called "Forest" part of the novel was separately published in the USSR. In 1968 the other part was published, in the journal "Baikal". A full version was published in 1972 in the Federal Republic of Germany and in the USSR in 1988. The brothers Strugatsky have described this novel as the most perfect and the most valuable of their works.

Plot summary
The novel consists of alternating chapters belonging to two loosely coupled parts: "Directorate" (or "Peretz", this part was published in 1968) and "Forest" (or "Candide", published in 1966).

Directorate 
A linguist Peretz, having been dreaming of visiting the Forest for years, has finally arrived at the Forest Directorate, with a distinct grim mid-20th century Soviet look and feel to it, perched on a high cliff amid endless Forest down below. He is unable to visit the Forest though, being refused the required permit time and again. He tries leaving the Directorate but each time is promised the car will be made available to him "tomorrow". All he can do is watch the Forest while sitting on the cliff's edge high above it, suffer through the car driver Tousik's endless sexcapades stories, and otherwise take part in Directorate life which is full of absurdity.

The Directorate has departments of Forest Studies; Armed Forest Security; Forest Eradication; Local Forest Population Assistance; Engineering Forest Penetration; Scientific Forest Preservation; etc. The Directorate personnel drink kefir with enormous appetite, calculate on broken mechanical calculators, issue strange orders, and listen to the Director General's personal messages on their stationary phones all at the same time. When a top secret robot escapes they hunt it down with their eyes taped shut to avoid the mandatory sentence for seeing it. Most of the staff only ever visit the Forest for a short trip to the bio-station where the salary payments are made. And this is the only way Peretz can enter the Forest.

When he is evicted from his hotel for the expired stay permit and still not being able to obtain his leave permit, having finally spent a night with Alevtina, a female employee who has long courted him, Peretz awakens to find himself the new Director General, and her as his personal assistant. Now at the top of this monstrosity, his every word is eagerly followed to the letter, however absurd the outcome might be.

Forest 
Candide, a Directorate employee, survived a helicopter crash over the Forest several years ago. Saved by the talkative natives (it is hinted his head was transplanted on a native's body), embraced and given a wife by them, he is now known as Silent, living among them in a village, his thinking almost as blurred and foggy as theirs. They lead simple lives in apparent symbiosis with the Forest, exhibiting some biological powers. From time to time he is able to remember his former life and is eager to get to the bio-station, to his own people. But the Forest is supposedly full of dangers; Candide wants the locals to help him travel through it. Every day he wakes up making plans to leave the village and go to "the City" "the day after tomorrow". One day this suddenly happens when his wife Nava asks him to accompany her to the nearest village and they go off the track unintentionally.

In their travels he finds out there is more to the Forest people than just villagers, who are in fact a forgotten leftovers from a past way of life, now being slowly discarded by the advanced and much more powerful parthenogenetic all-female  civilization based in and around lakes, in full control of the Forest. Sex is considered an atavism by them, an unwelcome relic of the past; any male, as nothing more than a he-goat to be disposed of; while the villages are being "overcome" one by one unawares—drowned, turned into lakes, together with the males—in a slow but unrelenting action. 

Thinking this future too cruel and terrible, having his wife taken away from him by the females who know he's an alien "from the cliffs" but still refuse to engage with him for being a male and chase him away, Candide decides to throw in his lot with the villagers. He returns home and tries to warn them but they take his stories of ruthless Amazon rulers of the Forest as laughable fairy tales. Whatever the future must be, decides Silent, his place is here, among these nice good people, trying to protect them as much as possible for as long as he possibly can.

Publishing 
The novel was translated into English in 1980 by Alan Myers and published by Bantam Books.

References

1966 novels
1966 in the Soviet Union
Novels by Arkady and Boris Strugatsky
1966 science fiction novels